Hudleston is a surname. Notable people with the surname include:

Edmund Hudleston (1908–1994), Royal Air Force officer
Guy Hudleston Boisragon (1864–1931), English Army officer
Josiah Andrew Hudleston (1799–1865), Anglo-Irish guitarist and composer
Wilfred Hudleston Hudleston (1828–1909), English geologist

See also
Huddleston